is a Japanese hip-hop/reggae group. The name "Spontania" comes from the English word "spontaneous".

In 2010, singer Kaori Natori became the permanent vocalist for the band.

Members
Massattack (マサタック masatakku?)
Born in Yokohama. Studied in Boston while in high school. DJ'd in New York City before debuting in Japan and was associated with Yuta and the Bushido Boys.
Tarantula (タランチュラ taranchura?)
Born 17 June 1977, Tokyo. Went abroad to the United States while in high school.
Is the rapper for the song "'Libera Me'from Hell" used in Gurren Lagann.
Kaori
Born September 3, 1982, Tokyo. Became a vocalist of the group in March 2010.

History
1996 Met in New York City and formed the group "Hi-Timez".
2004 Debuted under EMI as Hi-Timez.
2007 Met Micro from Def Tech, who had just established his own label, "Primary Color Recordz", under Universal's Far Eastern Tribe Records label. The group's name was changed from Hi-Timez to Spontania.

Discography

Singles

Hi-Timez

Spontania

Albums

Hi-Timez

Spontania

References

External links

Universal's Spontania homepage 
Spontania at Oricon

Japanese pop music groups
Universal Music Japan artists
Japanese hip hop groups
Musical groups from New York City